Robert E. Healy (March 25, 1883 – November 16, 1946) was a Vermont attorney and judge.  He was notable as one of the original appointees to the Securities and Exchange Commission, where he served from 1934 to 1946.  In addition, he served briefly as an associate justice of the Vermont Supreme Court from 1914 to 1915.

Early life
Robert Emmett Healy was born in Bennington, Vermont on March 25, 1883.  He graduated from Bennington High School in 1901, studied law with Orion M. Barber, and attained admission to the bar in 1904.

Early career
Healy practiced law in partnership with Barber until 1910, when Barber became a federal judge.  Healy then practiced as the partner of Edward H. Holden.  A Republican, Healy served in local office including Bennington's town agent, town grand juror, member of the town library's board of trustees, and school auditor.  Healy was a longtime member of the state Board of Bar Examiners beginning in 1909, and served as a trustee of Bennington College.  He was also active in several businesses, including serving as treasurer of The Vermont Company, which operated interurban electric railroads between Bennington and North Adams, Massachusetts, and Bennington and Troy, New York.  In addition, he served on the board of directors of the National Life Insurance Company.

In December 1914, Healy was nominated to serve as an associate justice of the Vermont Supreme Court, following the implementation of newly passed laws which reorganized Vermont's judiciary.  He replaced Loveland Munson, who was not renominated because of his advanced age.  In addition to Munson not being reappointed, longtime Associate Justice Seneca Haselton had also been denied another term on the court.  Munson had also been overlooked when the Chief Justice position was last filled in 1913; he was the most senior justice, and by custom the longest serving member of the court became Chief Justice when a vacancy occurred.  Public outcry over the treatment of Munson and Haselton led to the repeal of the court reorganization laws in January 1915.  As part of the repeal, Chief Justice George M. Powers agreed to serve as an Associate Justice, enabling Munson to become chief justice.  Leighton P. Slack agreed to return to the Vermont Superior Court, where he had served prior to his 1914 appointment to the Supreme Court.  In addition, Healy agreed to end his service on the Supreme Court and withdraw his request for confirmation by the Vermont General Assembly, enabling Haselton to return as an associate justice.

Continued career
After leaving the court, Healy continued to practice law in Bennington.  From 1918 to 1919, he served as president of the Vermont Bar Association.

In 1928, Healy was appointed as chief counsel of the Federal Trade Commission.  He served until 1934, and earned recognition for his investigations of utility holding companies and other corporations.  Healy's work drew attention to stock price manipulation and other questionable business practices that had played a role in creating the Great Depression, and led to legislative and regulatory reforms designed to end the abuses.

Healy's work at the FTC resulted in his 1934 appointment as a member of the Securities and Exchange Commission. During this time he was the lead council in the FTC's investigation of the nation's electric industry.  Healy was one of the commission's five original members, who included Joseph P. Kennedy Sr. (chairman), George C. Mathews, James M. Landis, and Ferdinand Pecora.  He served until his death, and was the longest-tenured of the original commissioners.

Death and burial
Healy died at his home in Germantown, Pennsylvania, outside of Philadelphia, on November 16, 1946.  He was buried in Section 6, Lot 151 of Rock Creek Cemetery in Washington, DC.

Family
In 1907, Healy married Sarah S. Houlihan (or Holihan) (1878-1966) of Bennington and Cohoes, New York.  They had no children.

Honors
In 1933, Healy was awarded the honorary degree of LL.D. by the University of Vermont.

References

Sources

Internet

Newspapers

Books

External links

1883 births
1946 deaths
People from Bennington, Vermont
Vermont lawyers
Vermont Republicans
U.S. state supreme court judges admitted to the practice of law by reading law
Justices of the Vermont Supreme Court
Members of the U.S. Securities and Exchange Commission
Burials at Rock Creek Cemetery
Franklin D. Roosevelt administration personnel
Truman administration personnel